Gisèle Bienne (born 1946 in Chavanges, Aube)  is a French writer who has written many novels. She lives in Reims, where she conducts writing workshops after she has been literature teacher and painter. She has published more than a dozen novels and won two literary awards. She also writes for magazines. She writes for adults but for teens that she met in college and high schools.

Works 
 Marie-salope, 1976
 Douce amère, 1977
 Rose enfance, 1978
 Je ne veux plus aller à l'école, 1980
 Bleu, je veux, 1983
 Premières alliances, 1988
 Rémuzor, 1994
 Un cheval sans papiers, 2005
 Chicago, je reviendrai, 2007
 Tatiana, sous les toits, 2008
 La chasse à l'enfant, 2009
 Grandir avec le Stade de Reims, 2022

External links

1946 births
Living people
People from Aube
20th-century French novelists
21st-century French novelists
20th-century French women writers
21st-century French women